Jon Wright (fl. 2009–2014) is a Northern Irish film director.

Jon Wright may also refer to:

 Jon Wright (footballer) (1925–2015), English footballer
 Jon Wright (snooker player) (born 1962), English snooker player

See also
 Joe Wright (disambiguation)
 John Wright (disambiguation)
 Jon Richt